Dublin Mid-West is a parliamentary constituency represented in Dáil Éireann, the lower house of the Irish parliament or Oireachtas. The constituency elects 4 deputies (Teachtaí Dála, commonly known as TDs) on the system of proportional representation by means of the single transferable vote (PR-STV).

History and boundaries
Dublin Mid-West contains the areas of Clondalkin, Lucan, Palmerstown, Rathcoole and Saggart. The constituency was created by the Electoral (Amendment) (No. 2) Act 1998 as a three-seat constituency, composed of areas which had previously been in the constituencies of Dublin South-West and Dublin West, and came into operation at the 2002 general election. Under the Electoral (Amendment) Act 2005, the town of Palmerstown was incorporated into Dublin Mid-West (having been in Dublin West), with an increase to 4 seats, taking effect at the 2007 general election. It has retained these boundaries since 2007.

TDs

Elections

2020 general election

2019 by-election
A by-election was held in the constituency on 29 November 2019 to fill the seat vacated by Frances Fitzgerald on her election to the European Parliament in May 2019.

2016 general election

2011 general election

2007 general election

2002 general election

See also
Dáil constituencies
Elections in the Republic of Ireland
Politics of the Republic of Ireland
List of Dáil by-elections
List of political parties in the Republic of Ireland

References

External links
 Oireachtas Constituency Dashboards
 Oireachtas Members Database

Dáil constituencies
Parliamentary constituencies in County Dublin
Politics of South Dublin (county)
2002 establishments in Ireland
Constituencies established in 2002